Jane Dyer (born 1949) is an American author and illustrator of more than fifty books, including Amy Krouse Rosenthal's Cookies series and Jeanne Birdsall's Lucky and Squash.

Background
Dyer grew up in New Jersey and Pennsylvania. She used to teach, write, and illustrate textbooks before she began illustrating children's books full-time. She was encouraged to begin illustrating by her students and their parents. She says she draws inspiration from the books of her childhood and the clothes her mother preserved from her own childhood, which Dyer liked to dress up in as a young girl.

Most of Dyer's work in children books illustrates family or home scenes. Dyer is a twin and often illustrates books with her daughter, Brooke Dyer. Dyer has a Tibetan Terrier named Scuppers.

In 2015, Dyer spoke at the Eric Carle Museum of Picture Book Art in Amherst, Massachusetts and read Lucky and Squash aloud as part of her talk on the art-making process for picture books.

Works
 Time for Bed (Mem Fox, 1997), illustrator
All We Know (Linda Ashman, 2016), illustrator
The House That's Your Home (Sally Lloyd-Jones, 2015), illustrator
There's A Train Out for Dreamland (Frederich H. Heider, 2010), co-illustrator (with Brooke Dyer)
Every Year on Your Birthday (Rose A. Lewis, 2007), illustrator
Hurry! Hurry! Have You Heard? ( Laura Krauss Melmed, 2008), illustrator
Wee Rhymes (Jane Yolen, 2013), illustrator
Lucky and Squash (Jeanne Birdsall, 2012), illustrator
Santa Claus and the Three Bears (Maria Modungo, 2013), co-illustrated with Brooke Dyer
Cookies: Bite-Size Lessons (Amy Krouse Rosenthal, 2006), illustrator
Christmas Cookies: Bite-Size Holiday Lessons (Amy Krouse Rosenthal, 2008), illustrator
One Smart Cookie: Bite-Size Lessons for the School Years and Beyond (Amy Krouse Rosenthal, 2010), co-illustrated with Brooke Dyer
Move Over, Rover! (Karen Beaumont, 2006)
Goodnight Goodnight Sleepyhead (Ruth Krauss, 2007), illustrator
Whose Garden Is It? (Mary Ann Hoberman, 2014), illustrator
I Love You Like Crazy Cakes (Rose A. Lewis, 2000), illustrator
A Woman For President: The Story of Victoria Woodhull (Kathleen Krull, 2006), illustrator
Oh My Baby, Little One (Kathi Appelt, 2006), illustrator
Cinderella's Dress (Nancy Willard, 2003), illustrator
Babies on the Go (Linda Ashman, 2003), illustrator
Good Morning, Sweeite Pie, and other Poems for Little Children (Cynthia Rylant, 2001), author and illustrator
Little Brown Bear Won't Take a Nap! (2002), author and illustrator
Little Brown Bear Won't Go to School! (2003), author and illustrator
Little Brown Bear and the Bundle of Joy (2005), author and illustrator
Sophie's Masterpiece: A Spider's Tale (Eileen Spinelli, 2004), illustrator
Blue Moon Soup: A Family Cookbook (Gary Goss, 2013), illustrator
When Mama Comes Home Tonight (Eileen Spinelli, 1998), illustrator
Child of Faerie, Child of Earth (Jane Yolen, 1997), illustrator
Animal Crackers: A Delectable Collection of Pictures, Poems, and Lullabies for the Very Young (1996), author
Cracked Corn and Snow Ice Cream: A Family Almanac (Nancy Willard, 1997), illustrator
The Snow Speaks (Nancy White Carlstrom, 1992), illustrator
If Anything Ever Goes Wrong at the Zoo (Mary Jean Hendrick, 1996), illustrator
The Random House Book of Bedtime Stories (2007), illustrator
Talking Like the Rain: A Read-To-Me Book of Poems (X.J. and Dorothy Kennedy, 2002), illustrator
The Girl in the Golden Bower (Jane Yolen, 1994), illustrator
Piggins (Jane Yolen, 1992), illustrator
Picnic With Piggins (Jane Yolen, 1993), illustrator
Piggins and the Royal Wedding (Jane Yolen, 1989), illustrator

Reception of works
Dyer has received multiple awards throughout her career, including two Parent's Choice Honor Books for Illustration awards.   In a School Library Journal review of Lucky and Squash, Anne Beier of the Hendrick Hudson Free Library in Montrose, New York, praises Dyer's illustrations and states that Dyer's paintings of the titular dogs' faces are priceless, particularly in the scenes where they are looking at each other through the fence and those where they are in their owners' arms. Similarly, a Kirkus Reviews article calls the illustrations in this book charming and writes that they "have all the clever details that are Dyer's signature touch". Connie Fletcher of Booklist suggests that, apart from the "ominous grays and greens" in the illustrations of one scene, the pastel-colored illustrations in the book are evocative of 1940s picture postcards, which she considers "just right for such jolly capers".

References

Living people
1949 births
American women illustrators
American children's book illustrators
21st-century American women